J. C. Ramaswamy (19 May 1928 – 2 August 1986), known by his screen name Shakti Prasad, was an Indian actor who appeared in Kannada films in mostly villainous roles. In a career spanning close to 20 years, he appeared in over 200 films including landmark films such as Immadi Pulikeshi (1967) and Antha (1981).

He is the father of actor Arjun Sarja and grandfather of actors Chiranjeevi Sarja, Dhruva Sarja and Aishwarya Arjun.

Partial filmography
 Immadi Pulikeshi (1967)
 Jedara Bale (1968)
 Goa Dalli CID 999 (1968)
 Boregowda Bangalorige Banda (1970)...Hulikunte Hanuma
 Bhale Huchcha (1972)
 Kulla Agent 000 (1972)
 Naagarahaavu (1972)
 Bangaarada Panjara (1974)
 Mayura (1975)...Narasimhadutta / Jada
 Beluvalada Madilalli (1975)
 Babruvahana (1977)
 Singaporenalli Raja Kulla (1978)...Gopinath Rao
 Kiladi Jodi (1978)
 Nanobba Kalla (1979)...Shankarappa
 Huliya Haalina Mevu (1979)...Muthanna
 Bhakta Siriyala (1980)
 Antha (1981)...CID Chief
 Haalu Jenu (1982)
 Sahasa Simha (1982)...Chakravarthy
 Khadeema Kallaru (1982)
 Chakravyuha (1983)...Lakshman Rao
 Eradu Nakshatragalu (1983)
 Samayada Gombe (1984)

References

External links
 

1986 deaths
Male actors from Karnataka
Indian male film actors
Male actors in Kannada cinema
20th-century Indian male actors
1928 births